Elections were held in Illinois on Tuesday, November 4, 1986.

Primaries were held March 18, 1986.

Election information
1986 was a midterm election year in the United States.

Creation of the Illinois Solidarity Party
After LaRouche movement disciples won the Democratic primaries for Lieutenant Governor and Secretary of State, Adlai Stevenson III created the Solidarity Party primarily to run Democratic candidates against them in the general election. He himself dropped off of the Democratic ticket for Governor, which he had won the primary for, and ran instead as the Solidarity Party candidate for Governor. The two Lyndon LaRouche-affiliated candidates, Mark J. Fairchild for Lieutenant Governor and Janice Hart for Secretary of State, had not seen their affiliations with LaRouche well-publicized until after they won their upset primary defeats over Stevenson-backed candidates George Sangmeister and Aurelia Pucinski. 

Illinois law required any unestablished party to run a full slate in order to obtain ballot access, thus, Stevenson ran candidates in all races.

Turnout
Turnout in the primary was 26.23%, with 1,602,156 ballots cast. 1,014,908 Democratic and 570,661 Republican primary ballots were cast.

Turnout in the general election was 55.34%, with 3,332,450 ballots cast.

Straight-ticket voting
Illinois had a straight-ticket voting option in 1986.

Federal elections

United States Senate

Incumbent Democratic Senator Alan Dixon was reelected.

United States House 

All Illinois seats in the United States House of Representatives were up for election in 1986.

State elections

Governor and Lieutenant Governor

Incumbent Governor James R. Thompson won reelection to a fourth term, defeating Adlai Stevenson III. This was a rematch of the previous 1982 gubernatorial election, which saw Stevenson as a Democratic nominee.

Stevenson, who had won the Democratic gubernatorial primary, withdrew from the Democratic ticket after Mark Fairchild, a follower of Lyndon LaRouche, won the Democratic primary for lieutenant governor. Stevenson refused to run on a ticket with supporters of LaRouche's ideology. Stevenson instead created the Illinois Solidarity Party and ran as its nominee.

Attorney General 

Incumbent Attorney General Neil Hartigan, a Democrat, was reelected to a second term.

Democratic primary
Incumbent Neil Hartigan defeated Chicago alderman Martin J. Oberman in the Democratic primary.

Hartigan had originally declared his intention to forgo seeking reelection, and instead run for governor, but he ultimately reversed course and sought reelection after Adlai Stevenson III entered the race for governor.

Republican primary
Republican Village President of Arlington Heights James T. Ryan won the Republican primary, running unopposed. Ryan stepped-down as nominee after allegations arose that he had committed domestic abuse against both his wife and ex-wife, which arose soon after he received his party's nomination.

There had been originally been several other candidates running for the Republican nomination in the primary, but all withdrew soon after Democratic incumbent Hartigan announced that he would seek reelection.

If he had been elected, Ryan would have been the first Republican sitting mayor elected to statewide office in Illinois since Edward C. Akin was elected Attorney General in 1898.

After Ryan withdrew as the Republican nominee, he was replaced on the ballot by Bernard Carey, a member of the Cook County Board of Commissioners who had also formerly served as Cook County State's Attorney from 1972 through 1980. Ryan's withdrawal had taken place five months before the general election.

General election

Secretary of State 

Incumbent Secretary of State Jim Edgar, a Republican first appointed in 1981 and subsequently elected to a full term in 1982, was reelected to a second full term.

Democratic primary
Little known candidate Janice Hart won an upset victory over Aurelia Pucinski (who had the backing of Adlai Stevenson III and others). While, not well-reported until after the primary, Hart was a member of the LaRouche movement.

Republican primary

General election
The Illinois Solidarity Party ran Jane N. Spirgel in the election. Spirgel was an outgoing member of the DuPage County Board (on which she was the sole remaining Democratic member and had first been elected in 1974).

Comptroller 

Incumbent Comptroller Roland Burris, a Democrat, was reelected to a third term.

Democratic primary

Republican primary
State Senator Adeline Jay Geo-Karis won the Republican primary unopposed.

General election

Treasurer 

Incumbent Treasurer James Donnewald, a Democrat, lost the Democratic primary to former Treasurer Jerome Cosentino. Consentino won the general election, earning him a second non-consecutive term.

Democratic primary
Incumbent James Donnewald lost renomination to former Treasurer Jerome Cosentino. Donnewald had been the party organization's favored candidate. Other candidates running included Cook County Board of Appeals member Pat Quinn and LaRouche movement member Robert D. Hart (who had the formal backing of Lyndon LaRouche's NDPC).

Republican primary
J. Michael Houston, the mayor of Springfield, won the Republican nomination. Houston was seeking to become the first Republican Illinois Treasurer in over twenty years. He was also seeking to be the first Republican sitting mayor elected to statewide office in Illinois since Edward C. Akin was elected Illinois Attorney General in 1898.

General election

State Senate
Some of the seats of the Illinois Senate were up for election in 1986. Democrats retained control of the chamber.

State House of Representatives
All of the seats in the Illinois House of Representatives were up for election in 1986. Democrats retained control of the chamber.

Trustees of University of Illinois

An election was held for three of nine seats for Trustees of University of Illinois system for six year terms.

The election saw the reelection incumbent Democrat Nina T. Shepherd to a third term, as well as the election of new Democratic trustees Judith Ann Calder and Charles Wolff.

First-term incumbent Republicans Galey Day and Dean E. Madden lost reelection.

Judicial elections
Multiple judicial positions were up for election in 1986.

Ballot measures
Illinois voters voted on two ballot measures in 1986, both of them legislatively referred constitutional amendments. In order to be approved, measures required either 60% support among those specifically voting on the amendment or 50% support among all ballots cast in the elections.

Bail Amendment
Voters approved the Bail Amendment, a legislatively refereed constitutional amendment which amended Article I, Section 9 of the Constitution of Illinois  to further expand the population that may be denied bail.

Exempt Veterans' Organizations from Property Taxes Amendment
Exempt Veterans' Organizations from Property Taxes Amendment, a legislatively refereed constitutional amendment which would amend Article IX, Section 6 of the Constitution of Illinois to exempt property used exclusively by veterans' organizations from property taxes, failed to meet either threshold amend the constitution.

Local elections
Local elections were held. These included county elections, such as the Cook County elections.

References

 
Illinois